Tongluo is a railway station on the Taiwan Railways Administration Taichung line located in Tongluo Township, Miaoli County, Taiwan.

History
The station was opened on 7 October 1903.

Around the station
 Miaoli Park

See also
 List of railway and metro stations in Taiwan

1903 establishments in Taiwan
Railway stations in Miaoli County
Railway stations opened in 1903
Railway stations served by Taiwan Railways Administration